The Distant Early Warning Line, also known as the DEW Line or Early Warning Line, was a system of radar stations in the far northern Arctic region of Canada, with additional stations along the North Coast and Aleutian Islands of Alaska, in addition to the Faroe Islands, Greenland, and Iceland. It was set up to detect incoming Soviet bombers during the Cold War, and provide early warning for a land based invasion.

Key
Lat/Long = Latitude and Longitude
DEW = DEW Line
DEW Aux = DEW Line Auxiliary site
DEW "I" site = DEW Line Intermediate site
DEW Main = DEW Line Main site
DEW Rear Comm. = DEW Line Rearward Communication site
NWS = North Warning System
NWS LRR = North Warning System Long Range Radar site
NWS SRR = North Warning System Short Range Radar site
NWS LSS = North Warning System Logistic Support site
a.k.a. = also known as
N/A DEW = Not applicable to the DEW Line
N/A NWS = Not applicable to the North Warning System

The sites

Dew Line Sites